Wojciech Fibak won in the final 6–7, 6–3, 6–4, 2–6, 6–1 against Raúl Ramírez.

Seeds

  Jimmy Connors (withdrew – back injury)
  Raúl Ramírez (final)
  Arthur Ashe (quarterfinals)
  Brian Gottfried (quarterfinals)
  Wojciech Fibak (champion)
  Vitas Gerulaitis (quarterfinals)
  Onny Parun (second round)
  Cliff Richey (second round)

Draw

Final

Section 1

Section 2

References

External links
 1976 Fischer-Grand Prix Draw

Singles